Salembaree is an obsolete variant of cotton cloth that was a coase, stout and heavy fabric. It was made in the Indian subcontinent. The cloth was used for tents in India and Pakistan. Kathee was an alternative name for Salembaree. John Forbes Watson mentions these fabrics under the Canvas category  in his work titled Textile Manufactures and Costumes of the people of India.

See also 

 Sailcloth
 Canvas

References 

Woven fabrics